Daal or DAAL may refer to:

 Dal (also daal), a dried pulse which has been split
 Dāl, Arabic letter د
 Ḏāl, Arabic letter ذ
 Data Analytics Acceleration Library, a library of optimized algorithmic building blocks for data analysis stages
 Dali (goddess), whose name is sometimes transliterated as "Daal"
 Mung Daal, a character in the cartoon show Chowder

See also
 Dal (disambiguation)
 Dahl (disambiguation)